Centaurus is a bright constellation of the southern hemisphere.

Centaurus may also refer to:

 Centaurus (Greek mythology), the founder of the Centaur race
 Centaurus A, a lenticular galaxy near the constellation
 Centaurus Cluster
 Centaurus (journal), the journal of the European Society for the History of Science
 The Centaurus, a building complex in Islamabad, Pakistan
 Bristol Centaurus, an aircraft engine
 Centaurus High School, a Colorado school
 Centaurus Advisors, a hedge fund run by John D. Arnold
, a Design 1013 cargo ship
 Centaurus (virus) (BA.2.75), a viral subvariant of the Omicron variant of SARS-CoV-2 that causes the disease COVID-19

See also
Centaur (disambiguation)
Centaure (disambiguation)
Centauri (disambiguation)